Dilbat (modern Tell ed-Duleim or Tell al-Deylam, Iraq) was an ancient Sumerian minor tell (hill city)  located southeast from Babylon on the eastern bank of the Western Euphrates in modern-day Al-Qādisiyyah, Iraq. The ziggurat E-ibe-Anu, dedicated to Urash, a minor local deity distinct from the earth goddess Urash, was located in the center of the city and was mentioned in the Epic of Gilgamesh.

History 
Dilbat was founded during the Sumerian Early Dynastic II period, around 2700 BC. It is known to have been occupied, at least, during the Akkadian, Old Babylonian, Kassite, Sasanian and Early Islamic periods. It was an early agricultural center cultivating einkorn wheat and producing reed products. It lay on the Arahtum canal.

Archaeology 
The site of Tell al-Deylam consists of two mounds, a small western mound with 1st millennium BC and Early Islamic  remains and a larger east mound, roughly 500 meters in circumference, with remains from the 1st to 3rd millennium BC. Dilbat was excavated briefly by Hormuzd Rassam, who recovered some cuneiform tablets at the site, mainly from the Neo-Babylonian period. The site was worked in 1989 by J. A. Armstrong of the Oriental Institute of Chicago. Though Dilbat itself has only been lightly excavated by archaeologists, numerous tablets from there have made their way to the antiquities market over the years as the result of unauthorized digging.

Excavations, by the Department of Archaeology of the University of Babylon, have resumed. Work began in 2017 and extended at least until 2020. A Kassite period temple to the city god was uncovered. Inscriptions were of one of the kings named Kurigalzu.

Tutelary god  

Dilbat, like many other Mesopotamian settlements had its own tutelary deity, Urash, a male deity distinct from the more well known goddess Urash associated with Anu. He was regarded as a farming god and a warror, similar to Ninurta.

Urash was regarded as the father of Nanaya, a goddess of love from the entourage of Inanna, as well as the minor underworld deity Lagamal, worshiped in Susa as an attendant of Inshushinak moreso than in Mesopotamia. Urash was also the husband of Ninegal ("lady of the palace"), and they had a joint temple, as attested by an Assyrian account of its renovation undertaken on the orders of Ashur-etil-ilani.

See also 
Cities of the Ancient Near East
 Tell (archaeology)

Notes

Further reading 
  Christine Lilyquist, The Dilbat Hoard, Metropolitan Museum Journal, vol. 29, pp. 5–36, 1994
 S. G. Koshurnikov and N. Yoffee, Old Babylonian Tablets from Dilbat in the Ashmolean Museum, Iraq, vol. 48, pp. 117–130, 1986
 Matthew W. Stolper, Late Achaemenid Texts from Dilbat, Iraq, vol. 54, pp. 119–139, 1992
Joseph Etienne Gautier, Archives d'une famille de Dilbat au temps de la premiere dynastie de Babylone, Le Caire, 1908
SG Koshurnikov,A Family Archive from Old Babylonian Dilbat, Vestnik Drevnii Istorii, vol. 168, pp. 123ff, 1984

External links 
 Sumer Map with Dilbat labeled as T. ed Duleim

Al-Qādisiyyah Governorate
Sumerian cities
Archaeological sites in Iraq
Former populated places in Iraq